Elections for the New South Wales Legislative Assembly were held in the state of New South Wales, Australia, on Saturday 13 February 1971. The Liberal-Country Party coalition government led by Sir Robert Askin won a third term in office. The Labor Party opposition was led by Pat Hills.

The Legislative Assembly had been enlarged by two members to 96 for the 1971 election. The seats of Sturt and Casino were established. Until 2019, this was the last time the Coalition won a third-term in New South Wales.

Key dates

Results

{{Australian elections/Title row
| table style = float:right;clear:right;margin-left:1em;
| title        = New South Wales state election, 13 February 1971
| house        = Legislative Assembly
| series       = New South Wales state election
| back         = 1968
| forward      = 1973
| enrolled     = 2,457,021
| total_votes  = 2,291,484
| turnout %    = 93.26
| turnout chg  = -0.93
| informal     = 53,628
| informal %   = 2.34
| informal chg = -0.29
}}

|}

{{ bar box |float=right| title=Popular vote | titlebar=#ddd | width=600px | barwidth=410px | bars= 

}}

Seats changing hands

 In addition, Labor held the seat of Georges River, which it had won from the Liberals at the 1970 by-election.

Post-election pendulum

See also
 Candidates of the 1971 New South Wales state election

Notes

References 

Elections in New South Wales
1971 elections in Australia
1970s in New South Wales
February 1971 events in Australia